The 2022 Metropolitans 92 vs. NBA G League Ignite series was two exhibition basketball games between Metropolitans 92 and the NBA G League Ignite. It was held at the Dollar Loan Center in Henderson, Nevada on October 4 and October 6, 2022. Featuring the projected top two picks in the 2023 NBA draft, Victor Wembanyama of Metropolitans and Scoot Henderson of the Ignite, the series drew international attention and has been regarded as among the greatest NBA prospect matchups in history. The Ignite won Game 1, 122–115, with strong performances from Wembanyama and Henderson, and Wembanyama led Metropolitans to a 112–106 win in Game 2, as Henderson left with an injury in the first quarter.

Background

On September 9, 2022, the NBA announced two exhibition games between the NBA G League Ignite, a developmental team in the NBA G League, and Metropolitans 92 of the LNB Pro A, the top-tier French league. The games were held at the Ignite's home arena, the Dollar Loan Center in Henderson, Nevada, on October 4 and October 6, 2022. Metropolitans played three Pro A games before traveling to the United States on October 1. Their game against Chorale Roanne was postponed to December 6, in agreement with the league and their opponent, so that they could participate in the series. The Ignite were scheduled to begin their regular season on November 4.

Metropolitans was led by head coach Vincent Collet and power forward Victor Wembanyama, who was widely expected to be the first overall pick in the 2023 NBA draft, with many analysts considering him a once-in-a-generation prospect. Wembanyama was in his first season with the team, which also included former NBA player Tremont Waters. The Ignite, under head coach Jason Hart, were led by point guard Scoot Henderson, the projected second pick in the draft, who was entering his second season with his team. The team had other draft prospects, including Leonard Miller and Sidy Cissoko, as well as veterans like former NBA player John Jenkins.

The games marked Wembanyama's debut in the United States and the first meeting between him and Henderson. Sports Illustrated described it as the most anticipated prospect matchup of the season. Entering the first game of the series, Wembanyama called it the biggest game of his life. Analysts viewed it as Henderson's best opportunity to gain consideration as the top prospect in the draft.

Game summaries
The series was scheduled for 7 p.m. PST on October 4 and 12 p.m. PST on October 6, 2022. Games were broadcast on ESPN2 and the NBA App, with Cory Alexander and John Schriffen as commentators. Agon Abazi, Julian McFadden and Catherine Chang served as referees for both games. The series was attended by more than 200 NBA executives and scouts, with representatives from all 30 NBA teams, and journalists from France, Canada and Brazil. NBA players Chris Paul, Devin Booker, DeMarcus Cousins, Trevor Ariza, Damion Lee and Duane Washington Jr., and WNBA players A'ja Wilson and Chelsea Gray, were in attendance for Game 1. NBA players Rudy Gobert and D'Angelo Russell attended Game 2.

Game 1

Game 2

Reaction
The performances of Wembanyama and Henderson received praise from NBA analysts and players. Wembanyama was called a "generational talent" by LeBron James and a "2K create a player" by Stephen Curry. The Athletic writer Sam Vecenie described Game 1 as the "best NBA draft prospect game of the century." The game drew comparisons to matchups between Magic Johnson and Larry Bird in the 1979 NCAA Division I basketball championship game, and between LeBron James and Carmelo Anthony in high school in 2002.

Analysts speculated that the success of Wembanyama and Henderson would influence teams to tank for the 2023 NBA draft. Wembanyama was advised by NBA executives to sit out until the draft but his agent said that he would continue playing.

In December 2022, Game 1 of the series was featured in the first episode of The Break, an eight-part docuseries produced by the NBA G League in partnership with The General. The episode was narrated by Shaquille O'Neal and included behind-the-scenes footage of the game.

References

October 2022 sports events in the United States
NBA G League Ignite
Basketball competitions in the Las Vegas Valley
Sports competitions in Henderson, Nevada
2022 in sports in Nevada